St. Matthias Church is a parish of the Roman Catholic Church in the Ridgewood neighborhood of Queens County, New York, in the Diocese of Brooklyn.

Its historic buildings include the parish church, completed in 1926, an Italian Renaissance Revival style, brick, stone, and terra cotta church with a gable roof which features a three-stage bell tower at the projecting center bay and Corinthian order columns. Also on the property are the contributing four-story rectory (1910), school (1909, 1913, 1950), and convent (1914). The entire complex was listed on the National Register of Historic Places in 2012.

History
Charles Edward McDonnell, Bishop of Brooklyn, created the parish on May 2, 1908, appointing Rev. Nicholas M. Wagner as first pastor. In September, Wagner negotiated the purchase of 20 lots on Elm Avenue (now Catalpa Avenue), and construction of the original church was underway by March, a building now used by the parochial school.

After World War I, fundraising and construction for a larger structure began, with the basement church completed in 1919. The cornerstone of the current church was laid October 5, 1924, and the building was completed in 1926.

References

External links
 

Properties of religious function on the National Register of Historic Places in Queens, New York
Renaissance Revival architecture in New York City
Religious organizations established in 1908
1908 establishments in New York (state)
Roman Catholic churches completed in 1926
Roman Catholic churches in Queens, New York
Churches on the National Register of Historic Places in New York (state)
20th-century Roman Catholic church buildings in the United States